Fagraea carstensensis is a species of flowering plant in the family Gentianaceae. It is endemic to Papua New Guinea. It is not well known, having been collected just twice.

References

carstensensis
Endemic flora of Papua New Guinea
Data deficient plants
Taxonomy articles created by Polbot
Taxa named by Herbert Fuller Wernham